SCAG may refer to one of the following:
Southern California Association of Governments
Heroin street term. Injected into the veins with a dirty needle

See also 
 Skag (disambiguation)